Rumont is the name of two communes in France:

 Rumont, Meuse, in the Meuse département
 Rumont, Seine-et-Marne, in the Seine-et-Marne département